Capture of Boer Battery by British is a black-and-white silent short docu-fiction film produced by James H. White for Edison Manufacturing Company in 1900. It is one minute in length and depicts the resistance of the Gordon Highlanders to the oncoming fire of the Boer's advance during the Boer War. It was filmed in West Orange, New Jersey USA and released April 14, 1900.

See also
 List of American films of 1900
Thomas Edison
Boer War
Silent film

External links

 
ftvdb.bfi.org.uk
New York Times

1900 films
American silent short films
American black-and-white films
1900s short documentary films
Black-and-white documentary films
Articles containing video clips
1900s war films
American short documentary films
1900 short films
1900s American films